Lei Cheng Uk was a group for villages of families of Lei/Lee/Li (李) and Cheng (鄭). The villages were demolished to build a public housing estate, Lei Cheng Uk Estate. At the beginning of the construction, a Han tomb was found there and named as "Lei Cheng Uk Han Tomb", which later became part of the Lei Cheng Uk Han Tomb Museum.

The name of a village, Sheung Lei Uk, is preserved in a park, Sheung Li Uk Garden.

See also
Lei Cheng Uk Han Tomb Museum
Lei Cheng Uk Estate

Sham Shui Po District
Places in Hong Kong
New Kowloon